Iñigo Lekue Martínez (born 4 May 1993) is a Spanish professional footballer who plays for Athletic Bilbao mainly as a right-back.

Club career
Born in Bilbao, Biscay, Basque Country, Lekue graduated from Danok Bat CF's youth system. In summer 2012 he moved to Athletic Bilbao, and made his debut as a senior with the farm team in Tercera División.

On 21 June 2013, Lekue was promoted to the reserves in Segunda División B. On 29 June 2015, after being an ever-present figure during the side's promotion to Segunda División after a 19-year absence, he was promoted to the main squad in La Liga.

Lekue made his official debut with the first team on 15 August 2015, coming on as a second-half substitute for fellow youth graduate Sabin Merino in a 4–0 home rout of FC Barcelona for the Supercopa de España. He made his first league appearance 15 days later, being taken off at half-time in a 2–0 loss at neighbouring SD Eibar.

Lekue scored his first senior goal on 21 December 2015, equalising for the reserves in a 1–1 home draw against CD Lugo. The following 3 April he scored for the first time in the top flight, opening a 1–1 draw with Granada CF at the San Mamés Stadium. On 8 June 2016, he agreed to a contract extension until 2019.

On 24 November 2016, Lekue netted his first European goal to win a UEFA Europa League group match 3–2 at home to U.S. Sassuolo. He missed most of the 2018–19 season with back issues, returning as a late substitute on 16 March in a 2–0 home win over Atlético Madrid.

International career
On 22 May 2016, Lekue was called up to the Spain national team by manager Vicente del Bosque, after Jonny withdrew due to "personal reasons".

Career statistics

Club

Honours
Athletic Bilbao
Supercopa de España: 2015, 2020–21
Copa del Rey runner-up: 2019–20, 2020–21

References

External links

1993 births
Living people
Spanish footballers
Footballers from Bilbao
Association football defenders
Association football midfielders
Association football utility players
La Liga players
Segunda División B players
Tercera División players
Danok Bat CF players
CD Basconia footballers
Bilbao Athletic footballers
Athletic Bilbao footballers